Raghuraj Singh Kansana is an Indian politician. He was elected to the Madhya Pradesh Legislative Assembly from Morena. He was an elected member of the Madhya Pradesh Legislative Assembly as a member of the Indian National Congress.  During 2020 Madhya Pradesh political crisis, he supported senior Congress leader Jyotiraditya Scindia and was one of the 22 MLAs who resigned and later joined Bharatiya Janata Party.

References

Madhya Pradesh MLAs 2018–2023
Bharatiya Janata Party politicians from Madhya Pradesh
Living people
People from Morena
Indian National Congress politicians from Madhya Pradesh
Year of birth missing (living people)